Sengenya is a ceremonial dance of the Digo tribe who live mainly in the Kwale district on the coastal province of Kenya. It is primarily centered on a song and dance performance that takes place during the day and night.  Sengenya is typified by the actual participation of the audience who are invited to do so when requested.

During its formative stage sengenya was characterised by four movements, and this has now descended to two movements. This was the result of two different rhythms generated from six drums. The corollary of this is the introduction of two new dance genres – i.e. goma and zandale – these were part of the original sengenya dance genre.

The word goma refers to one of the newly created dance movements and is a Duruma word denoting either  drums  or  dance. This  is  because  of  the  vigorous nature and style of the dance movement. When  goma  was  formed,  it  was  supposed  to  be  performed  during nyeresa mwezi (the  Giriama), lusinga (the  Chonyi), hangaifu (the  Duruma)  and matanga  ya  pili (the Waswahili).

The essence of Goma dance is the expression of passing food and music to those who have died. This enables them to join their ancestors who died earlier before they are entirely forgotten. Goma dance indeed, can be performed in the absence of any funerals, but purely as a homage to their ancestors.

On the other hand the genre of Zandale dance, is performed by the Duruma, Giriama and the Digo tribes. An instrument called the Chivoti is played at the outset before the dance commences.

Goma dance is meant to give food and music to the dead on their way to join the earlier departed ancestors before they are completely forgotten. Goma dance can also be performed with no specific funeral at hand, but rather, as a heritage to honor the ancestors. Zandale dance, another new creation are performed by the Duruma,  Giriama  and  the  Digo. Chivoti is played  as  a  prelude  before  dance  is  started.

The chivoti instrument is played early in the morning by the Vijana (the youth) to alert members of the community of the onset of dawn (mabarubaru or mahoho alume). This can also be denoted that the young boys were ready to take cattle to the grazing fields as they have finished milking the cows. This signified that the boys were proud to undertake their tasks regardless of the physical and mental attribute of their male adult counterparts – especially if they were tired.

After the introduction by chivoti (designed  to  alert  the  people), nzumari (a  powerful musical medium designed  to  send messages)  prevails  in order to  invite  people,  in particular,  members  of  the  dance  troupe,  to  come  and  greet  the audience.

Kenyan music